July 2014

See also

References

 07
July 2014 events in the United States